= Alliance Fiber Optic Products =

Alliance Fiber Optic Products Inc.
- Company type: Subsidiary
- Traded as: Nasdaq: AFOP
- Industry: Semiconductor - Broad Line
- Founded: 1995; 31 years ago
- Headquarters: Sunnyvale, California, United States
- Key people: Peter C. Chang (CEO, president, and chairman) (2012.12)
- Products: Connectivity Products; Optical Passive Products
- Parent: Corning Inc.
- Website: www.afop.com

Alliance Fiber Optic Products Inc. was a company founded in 1995 and now is based in Sunnyvale, California. The company engages in fiber optic components and integrated modules for communications equipment.

It was acquired by Corning Inc. in 2016.
